Aquilino Fabriciano Rodríguez Ávila (August 9, 1907 – October 22, 1997), better known as Kelly Rodriguez, was a Spanish-American professional American football player in the National Football League (NFL).

He played as a back for the Frankford Yellow Jackets and Minneapolis Red Jackets in the 1930 season. He and his brother Jess Rodriguez were the first people from Spain to play in the NFL, and the second and third people of Hispanic descent to do so after Ignacio Molinet.

References

1907 births
1997 deaths
People from Avilés
Frankford Yellow Jackets players
Minneapolis Red Jackets players
West Virginia Wesleyan Bobcats football players
Spanish players of American football